Ronald F. Levant is a psychologist, a professor, and a former president of the American Psychological Association (APA). After earning an undergraduate degree at the University of California, Berkeley, Levant completed a Doctor of Education (EdD) at Harvard University. He also holds a Master of Business Administration (MBA) from Boston University.

Much of Levant's work has focused on men and fatherhood. At Boston University in the 1980s, Levant taught eight-week parenting courses for fathers. He authored the parenting guide Between Father and Child in the 1980s. From 2007 to 2015, he served as the editor of the journal Psychology of Men and Masculinity. He is widely considered one of the key people responsible for creating the new field of the psychology of men and masculinities. He was included in the Elsevier-Stanford University data base listing the top 2% of scientists in the world. His subfields are listed as social psychology (rank # 577) and clinical psychology (rank # 626).

Levant is a psychology professor emeritus at the University of Akron. He has also held faculty appointments at Boston University, Harvard Medical School, Rutgers University and Nova Southeastern University. He was the APA president in 2005. He is also a former president of the Massachusetts Psychological Association, and of two Divisions of APA: 43 (Family Psychology) and 51 (Psychology of Men and Masculinities). He was awarded the APA Award for Distinguished Professional Contributions to Applied Research in 2011. His coauthored book, The Tough Standard: The Hard Truths About Masculinity and Violence (2020, Oxford University Press, with Shana Pryor) won the William James Book Award from Division 1 (General Psychology) of APA in 2021.

Selected publications
  (with John Kelly). .
 . 
 Masculinity Reconstructed. Dutton, 1995. (With Gini Kopecky). ISBN 0-525-93846-X 
  (editor, with Gary R. Brooks). .
  (with Y. Joel Wong). .
  (with Shana Pryor). .

References

Living people
University of California, Berkeley alumni
Harvard Graduate School of Education alumni
Boston University School of Management alumni
Boston University faculty
Nova Southeastern University faculty
Rutgers University faculty
Presidents of the American Psychological Association
Year of birth missing (living people)